Michel Martin Leon Fourquet (1914-20 November 1992), was a French soldier and administrator who served as the Chief of Staff of Armed Forces from 1968 to 1971.

Michel Fourquet, a French air officer was born 9 June 1914 in Brussels and enrolled in Free France Force in 1940, he served the Groupe Lorraine and he was later an attaché in the fourth republic cabinet and he did served as the spokesman, and organiser of French nuclear energy.
He Commands about 600,000 French soldiers in Algeria of which was during the reign of Charles De Gaulle, he oversees French troops departure in the Algeria in 1962, although the Algerians where control by rightist Secret Armed Organization.
He participated in the During World War II of which he was decorated with commander of Groupe Lorraine on a unit attached to Royal Air Force together with Pierre Mendes-France.

Commands 
He Commands the First Tactical Air Group 5th Air Region Algiers in 1961 and rose to be Chief Commandant Forces Algeria in 1962 during the First Helicopter War. He was the Secretary General of National Defence until 1966 as permanent Under-Secretary for Armaments to 1968 and rose to the rank of general de Aerial in 1968 to be the Chief of Staff of Armed Forces.

Personal life 
He is married to Micheline Roger in 1939 and blessed with five children.

Awards Decorations 

 Distinguished Flying Cross

References 

 

1914 births
1992 deaths
French soldiers
French generals
People from Brussels